Laura Matsuda is a fictional character from the Street Fighter series of video games, making her first appearance in 2016's Street Fighter V. She is the sister of Sean Matsuda, a character from 1997's Street Fighter III and its updates. She is from Brazil, and much like fellow Brazilian character Blanka, she utilizes electricity in some of her attacks. Critically, the character has received mixed reception, with her moveset being praised, but her story and design being criticized.

Character design and appearances
Laura Matsuda's fighting style is Jiu-Jitsu, known in-game as "Matsuda Jiu-Jitsu." She is considered a grappler, but uncommon for a grappler, she has a projectile attack. Similar to Blanka, Laura use electricity in some of her attacks. However, unlike Blanka, she also has an electric projectile. Another notable attack includes Laura grappling the opponent and slamming their face into the ground.

Laura's primary outfit consists of a green blouse that leaves her abdomen and a portion of her breasts exposed, and green chaps with black tights underneath, as well as several bracelets on her arms and shin  guards on her feet. Most of her alternate outfits shows her wearing hotpants or some type of swimsuit.

Some of the early designs of Laura portrayed her with dreadlocks and larger hips. She originally lacked tights underneath her chaps, exposing her hips and a portion of her buttocks. Another early design of Laura portrayed her as a mechanic, using mechanical tools as weapons, as well the ability to rip off her clothes. Laura's final design has been compared to the similarly surnamed Gezary Matuda, as well as the mixed martial artist Ronda Rousey. Moveset-wise, she's been compared to real-life Brazilian Jiu-Jitsu fighter Kyra Gracie. 

Laura debuted in Street Fighter V as one of the 16 characters in the game's initial roster, officially being revealed at the Brasil Game Show on  October 8, 2015, four months prior to the game's release. A Brazilian fighter and sister of Sean Matsuda, Laura was trained by her maternal grandfather Kinjiro of the art of Jiu-Jitsu, which she later becomes the heir of. She looks for opponents to fight to promote her fighting style. The story mode shows her joining the other heroes in their attempt to stop Shadaloo.

Laura appeared in the mini-series Street Fighter: Resurrection, where she is portrayed by Natascha Hopkins.

Merchandise
In 2019, a collectable statue of Laura was released. The statue showcases Laura in a blue and purple bikini.

In 2022, Laura was featured on one of the covers of the Street Fighter Swimsuit Special 1 issue.

Reception
At Paste, Laura was ranked as the 41st best Street Fighter character by Suriel Vazquez and Eric Van Allen, who noted her as among the most "unique" additions to the series in recent years, further stating "Her current story bits are a little weak (at this point, everyone travels the world to exhibit their prowess), but her spunk and use of Brazilian Jiu Jitsu make her a solid new addition to the lengthy Street Fighter gallery." Gavin Jasper at Den of Geek was more critical of the character, ranking her as the 65th best Street Fighter character, and naming her as the worst addition in Street Fighter V's base roster, adding "She instead turned out to be incredibly annoying with little to add to the roster. Her attributes appear to be that she’s Sean’s less-interesting sister." Jasper nonetheless praised her design and fighting style. Ash Bates from Cultured Vultures listed Laura as one of the character they would like to see return for Street Fighter 6, observing "With the success of the UFC and MMA in general, including a character like Laura represented a modernisation for the series. Instead of focusing on traditional styles, Laura brought something new and relevant to the series, only Capcom improved it by including electricity powers too." In a similar list by James Kennedy from The Gamer, Laura was listed as a character they wanted to see in Street Fighter 6, opining "We love the speedy grappler archetype and, honestly, we think Laura may just be the best example of that."

Laura's depiction as a sexualized character with a highly suggestive outfit in Street Fighter V has attracted commentary. In an opinion piece published by Red Bull, Greg Candalez drew attention to comments made by producer Yoshinori Ono during an October 2015 interview, where Ono admitted that Laura reflected the fanciful perception the Japanese public have of Brazilian women. Candalez said Laura exemplifies the inappropriate and inaccurate stereotype of Brazilian women by international audiences as being sensual and prone to dressing provocatively. In addition, an article by The Daily Telegraph listed Laura, along with R. Mika from the same game, as examples of "porn-type heroines [that] are harming children," highlighting their outfits in the game. Similarly, Christopher Hodges of Screen Rant was critical of her design, saying she was "...designed only to be hot and absurdly-dressed and not a character with any actual depth." Hodges considered R. Mika to at least be an "interesting, unique character," unlike Laura.

Laura was studied by the Brazilian Society for Interdisciplinary Studies of Communication on her portrayal of race and feminism, where they observe "Laura has her image and her body hypersexualized and objectified for the contemplation of the players." In the analyses, they state "...there is a band between the buttocks that emphasizes and provokes the look for that region. Your body is purposely exposed so that the male gaze is met, even if this exhibition does not present practical coherence with the role it performs, that is, a fighter who should dress accordingly." After noting the colors of her outfit and the bracelets worn on her arms, they state "...it is possible to state that Laura carries in her image signs that express sensuality, joy, sexualization, miscegenation and Brazilian identity." Comparing Laura with her brother Sean in terms of race, the study observes "...the "whitening of the character so that, even though she is not white, she remains within the aesthetic standards eurocentric..."

Animus Inter-American Journal of Media Communication also studied Laura and other Brazilian fighters in the Street Fighter franchise. While analyzing Laura's race and her outfits, they note "The combination of these elements leads to the conclusion that Laura can be interpreted as an iconic quali-sign of sensuality." They further state that she represents "...beautiful and sensual women,
where warmth and music are an integral part of life. In Laura is a symbol of Brazil Country of Carnival, joyful, festive and touristic.

References

Capcom protagonists
Female characters in video games
Fictional Brazilian people in video games
Fictional martial artists in video games
Street Fighter characters
Video game characters introduced in 2016
Video game characters with electric or magnetic abilities
Fictional jujutsuka